"Go That Deep" is a song by NUfrequency featuring Shara Nelson released as a single in 2008 on NRK Sound Division in the UK, Spinnin' Records in the Netherlands and on Rebirth in Italy.

Track listing

12" Vinyl Single [Part 1], NRK Sound Division

 A1 Go That Deep (Charles Webster Remix) 7:27
 A2 Go That Deep (Charles Webster Reprise) 5:30
 B1 Go That Deep (Charles Webster Acid Remix) 7:04
 B2 Go That Deep (Kemistry's Shack Music Mix) 7:27

12" Vinyl Single [Remixes], NRK Sound Division
 A1 Go That Deep (Skylark Club Remix) 8:25
 A2 Go That Deep (Skylark Vocal Remix) 7:17
 B1 Go That Deep (Paul Woolford Remix) 10:10

12" Vinyl Single, Rebirth
 A1 Go That Deep (Charles Webster Remix) 7:27
 B1 Go That Deep (Redanka's 93 Vocal Mix) 7:53

CD Single, Spinnin' Records
 Go That Deep (Radio Edit) 3:54
 Go That Deep (Charles Webster Radio Edit) 3:28
 Go That Deep (Original Album Mix) 6:57
 Go That Deep (Charles Webster Remix) 7:25

Digital Single, NRK Sound Division
 Go That Deep (Charles Webster Radio Edit) 3:30
 Go That Deep (Charles Webster Remix) 7:30
 Go That Deep (Skylark Club Remix) 8:25
 Go That Deep (Skylark Vocal Remix) 7:17
 Go That Deep (Kemistry's Shack Music Mix) 7:27
 Go That Deep (Original Radio Edit) 3:56

Digital Single [Paul Woolford Mixes], NRK Sound Division
 Go That Deep (Paul Woolford Main Mix) 10:10
 Go That Deep (Paul Woolford Dub Mix) 8:10

References

External links

2008 singles
Shara Nelson songs
2008 songs
Songs written by Shara Nelson